Clément Reix (born 9 October 1983) is a French retired professional tennis player. He reached the second round of the 2012 Moselle Open as a qualifier. He is married to French player Shérazad Benamar.

References

External links
 
 

Living people
French male tennis players
1983 births
21st-century French people